Debt Justice (formerly Jubilee Debt Campaign, Jubilee Debt Coalition and Drop The Debt) is a UK-based campaigning organisation that exists to end unjust developing countries' debt and the poverty and inequality it perpetuates. The organisation’s activities include campaigning, advocacy, community organising and activism and aims to build collective power with people most affected by debt to demand a fair economy for all.

History 

The Coalition was formed as a successor organisation to the Jubilee 2000 Coalition.  Many campaigners felt that it was necessary to continue working together to monitor the G8's promise to deliver $100 billion of debt relief at Cologne in 1999, and make further progress on the cancellation of the poorest countries' debts.

The name was chosen in 1995/1996, as preparations were gathering pace for the celebration of the millennium.  The concept was that justice and poverty alleviation through the cancellation of debts would be a fitting celebration for the millennium.  The concept of debt cancellation and celebration is linked to the Old Testament concept of Jubilee, which meant that every 50 years, people sold into slavery, or land sold due to bankruptcy, were redeemed.

Location 

The campaign's Secretariat is in Islington, London.

See also 
 Jubilee 2000
 Jubilee USA Network
 Odious debt

References

External links 
 Jubilee Debt Campaign
 Jubilee USA
 Jubilee Australia

Development charities based in the United Kingdom
Third World debt cancellation activism